William Oscar Hodges (born March 9, 1943) is an American basketball coach.  He was the head basketball coach at Indiana State University from 1978 to 1982, at Georgia College and State University from 1986 to 1991 and at Mercer University from 1991 to 1997.

Career
As an assistant basketball coach at Indiana State University, he recruited Larry Bird after Bird had dropped out of Indiana University. Before the start of the 1978–79 season, Hodges was hired as Head Coach at Indiana State University after head coach Bob King suffered a brain aneurysm. Hodges proceeded to lead Indiana State with Larry Bird to an undefeated regular season and a second-place finish in the 1979 NCAA Division I men's basketball tournament, losing to Michigan State University and Magic Johnson in the NCAA Final.  During that year, after a 33-1 record, Hodges won several coach of the year awards, including the UPI's and AP's. The Sycamores were selected as the United Press International Collegiate Champions.  His later Indiana State teams would never reach the same heights, leading to his resignation from Indiana State after the 1982 season.

Hodges is currently #7 in coaching wins at Indiana State with a record of 67–48 (.583) and #5 in wins at Mercer with a record of 62–107 (.367). His record at Georgia College was 110–53 (.675). His overall collegiate head coaching record is 239–208 (.535). Hodges is a graduate of Purdue University.

Moving to live near his daughter, Hodges returned to high school teaching and coaching to keep busy and coach his granddaughter. He coached the boys basketball teams Roanoke Catholic High School and North Cross School in Roanoke, Virginia from 2011 to 2013, where he led North Cross to the VISAA state tournament where they upset Carlisle School in the semifinals and went on to play for the state title, but came up just short. He then coached the girls team at The Villages Charter High School in The Villages, Florida as of the 2016–17 season.

Personal
Hodges also coached golf at Armstrong Atlantic State University before moving to Indiana State.  He is a Vietnam-era veteran of the United States Air Force.

Inducted in 1999, Hodges is a member of the Indiana State University Athletic Hall of Fame as part of the 1978–79 men's basketball team.

In 2019, Hodges was inducted into the Indiana State University Athletic Hall of Fame individually.

Head coaching record

See also
 List of NCAA Division I men's basketball tournament Final Four appearances by coach
 Bill Hodges interview 2019

References

1943 births
Living people
American men's basketball coaches
Basketball coaches from Indiana
College golf coaches in the United States
Georgia College Bobcats men's basketball coaches
High school basketball coaches in Florida
High school basketball coaches in Virginia
Indiana State Sycamores men's basketball coaches
Long Beach State Beach men's basketball coaches
People from Zionsville, Indiana
Mercer Bears men's basketball coaches
Tennessee Tech Golden Eagles men's basketball coaches